Mánnu is an album by the Northern Sámi folk music group Angelit, released in 1999 in Finland. The word "Mánnu" means the moon in Northern Sámi. This was the first album of new material they produced after changing their name from Angelin tytöt to Angelit in 1997.

A video recording was made of a live performance of Gárkit.

Musicians

Angelit
Tuuni Länsman – vocals, yoiking
Ursula Länsman – vocals, yoiking

Visitors
Mamba Assefa – percussion
Alfred Häkkinen – guitar, vocals
Kimmo Kajasto – keyboards, computer programming
Samuli Kosminen – percussion

Track listing
The eleven tracks are:
 "Anar Gilli (Inari Village)" – Kimmo Kajasto / Tuuni Länsman – 4:09
 "Gárkit (Escape)" – Kimmo Kajasto / Tuuni Länsman – 3:31
 "Cilli Geres (Gossiping Woman)" – Alfred Häkkinen / Kimmo Kajasto / Tuuni Länsman – 3:56
 "Ruojain Ruoktot (Speeding Home)" – Tuuni Länsman – 2:14
 "Curvot Mu (Calling Me)" – Kimmo Kajasto / Tuuni Länsman – 6:19
 "Uldá (Gnome)" – Kimmo Kajasto / Tuuni Länsman – 4:19
 "Ánne-Kirste Máret (Ánne-Kirste Máret)" – Traditional – 1:48
 "Reivve (Letter)" – Kimmo Kajasto – 5:09
 "Inkuna Ganda (Inkuna-Boy)" – Traditional – 3:29
 "Eatnama Heagga (Earth Spirit)" – Kimmo Kajasto / Tuuni Länsman – 4:55
 "Mánnu (The Moon)" – Kimmo Kajasto – 7:28

References

External links

1999 albums
Angelit albums